Rich Bottom Farm is a historic home located near Purcellville, Loudoun County, Virginia. The house was built in three sections between about 1780 and 1820. It is a two-story, limestone and brick structure with a side gable roof in the Federal style. The front facade features an eight bay, full-width frame porch. Also on the property are the contributing two-story limestone spring house and limestone smokehouse.

It was listed on the National Register of Historic Places in 1997.

References

Houses on the National Register of Historic Places in Virginia
Federal architecture in Virginia
Houses completed in 1820
Houses in Loudoun County, Virginia
National Register of Historic Places in Loudoun County, Virginia
Purcellville, Virginia